The 1983–84 Divizia B was the 44th season of the second tier of the Romanian football league system.

The format has been maintained to three series, each of them having 18 teams. At the end of the season the winners of the series promoted to Divizia A and the last four places from each series relegated to Divizia C.

Team changes

To Divizia B
Promoted from Divizia C
 Chimia Fălticeni
 Partizanul Bacău
 Olimpia Râmnicu Sărat
 Unirea Slobozia
 Metalul Plopeni
 Chimia Turnu Măgurele
 Constructorul Craiova
 CFR Caransebeș
 Minerul Lupeni
 Steaua CFR Cluj
 Avântul Reghin
 Nitramonia Făgăraș

Relegated from Divizia A
 FCM Brașov
 Politehnica Timișoara
 FC Constanța

From Divizia B
Relegated to Divizia C
 Minerul Gura Humorului
 Pandurii Târgu Jiu
 CIL Sighetu Marmației
 IMU Medgidia
 MF Steaua București
 UM Timișoara
 Viitorul Mecanica Vaslui
 Drobeta-Turnu Severin
 Strungul Arad
 Viitorul Gheorgheni
 Precizia Săcele
 Înfrățirea Oradea

Promoted to Divizia A
 Dunărea CSU Galați
 Rapid București
 Baia Mare

Renamed teams
CSM Sfântu Gheorghe was renamed as IMASA Sfântu Gheorghe.

League tables

Serie I

Serie II

Serie III

See also 
 1983–84 Divizia A

References

Liga II seasons
Romania
2